Canadian Civil War may refer to:

 Canada and the American Civil War the events in the colonies of British North America during the U.S. civil war (1861–65).
 The rebellions of 1837–1838, two armed uprisings in what are now Quebec and Ontario
 Canadian Civil War, a board game by Simulations Publications, Inc.

See also 
 Riel Rebellion (disambiguation), two uprisings led by Louis Riel 1869 and 1885, in what are now Manitoba and Saskatchewan